Afghanistan competed at the 2012 Summer Olympics in London, United Kingdom from 27 July to 12 August 2012. Six Afghan athletes were selected for the Games, competing in four different sporting events. Rohullah Nikpai, who won Afghanistan's first ever Olympic medal at the 2008 Games, managed to repeat his bronze medal in the men's 68 kg taekwondo event for the second time.

Medalists

The following Afghan competitors won medals at the Games. In the 'by discipline' sections below, medallists' names are in bold.

Athletics

Afghanistan has selected two athletes by wildcard. Both athletes competed in the 100 m sprint and did not qualify to the quarterfinals. Tahmina Kohistani might have been the slowest runner in the women's 100m, however; taking part at the Olympics was considered a triumph due to the pressures against women in sport. Kohistani wishes that her performance would inspire other Afghan women to enter sports.

Track & road events

Boxing

Afghanistan was given a tripartite invitation to compete in boxing. Despite losing in the first round, boxer Ajmal Faisal enjoyed the Olympic experience, stating that there is a lack of boxing facilities and opposition by the Taliban and other political groups towards boxing. He also credited AIBA for providing a training camp for him and other fighters in order to "compete and last for three rounds against tougher opponents."

Judo

Afghanistan's Ajmal Faizzada was given an invitation to compete in judo and competed in the -66 kg weight class. He lost to Hungary's Miklós Ungvári in the first round match by harai makikomi.

Taekwondo

Afghanistan qualified two male athletes through their performance at the 2011 Asian Taekwondo Olympic Qualification Tournament.  2008 Olympic and 2011 World bronze medalist Rohullah Nikpai competed in the -68 kg category and 2010 Asian Games silver medalist Nesar Ahmad Bahave competed in the -80 kg category.  Rohullah Nikpai managed repeat his performance from Beijing four years ago in a heavier weight category by winning the bronze medal after defeating Great Britain's Martin Stamper.  Nesar Ahmad Bahave also advanced to the bronze medal match; however, having severe injuries throughout the entire competition, he was unable to defeat Italy's Mauro Sarmiento, and was taken to the hospital shortly after the match.  Despite his defeat, Bahave earned much respect from his people in Afghanistan.

References

External links
 

Nations at the 2012 Summer Olympics
2012
2012 in Afghan sport